Gastrina is a monotypic moth genus in the family Geometridae. Its only species, Gastrina cristaria, the wave-lined geometrid, is found in the south-eastern quarter of Australia. Both the genus and species were first described by Achille Guenée in 1857.

References

Nacophorini
Moths of Australia
Moths described in 1857
Monotypic moth genera